The Dreams That Stuff Is Made of: The Most Astounding Papers of Quantum Physics and How They Shook the Scientific World is a 2011 book by English physicist Stephen Hawking.

Overview
The book compiles the essential works from the scientists that changed the face of physics, including works by Niels Bohr, Max Planck, Werner Heisenberg, Erwin Schrodinger, J. Robert Oppenheimer, Richard Feynman, and Max Born.

References

2011 non-fiction books
Books by Stephen Hawking
Running Press books